The 1973–74  Gonzaga Bulldogs men's basketball team represented Gonzaga University during the 1973–74 NCAA Division I basketball season. Members of the Big Sky Conference, the Bulldogs were led by 
second-year head coach Adrian Buoncristiani and played their home games on campus at Kennedy Pavilion in Spokane, Washington.

Senior center Stewart Morrill was selected to the all-conference team and junior guard Ken Tyler was on the second team.

References

External links
Sports Reference – Gonzaga Bulldogs: 1973–74 basketball season

Gonzaga Bulldogs men's basketball seasons
Gonzaga
Gonzaga Bulldogs men's basketball team
Gonzaga Bulldogs men's basketball team